The Irish Sprint Cup formerly known as the Irish National Cup is a greyhound racing competition held annually at Dundalk Stadium in Dundalk, County Louth, Ireland. 

It was held at the Dunmore Park Greyhound Stadium from 1943 until 2000 until the track closed in 1996 and then it returned in 1999 at Ballyskeagh before switching to Dundalk in 2004. It is a prestigious invitation event held for Ireland's leading sprinters and is an integral part of the Irish greyhound racing calendar.

Past winners

Venues & distances
1943–1996 (Dunmore Park 435 yards)
1999–2002 (Ballyskeagh/Drumbo Park 325 yards) 
2004–2004 (Dundalk 410 yards)
2005–present (Dundalk 400 yards)

Sponsors
2004–present (Bar One Racing Ltd)

References

Greyhound racing competitions in Ireland
Sport in Dundalk
Sport in County Louth
Recurring sporting events established in 1943